The list of women Impressionists attempts to include women artists who were involved with the Impressionist movement or artists.

The four most well known women Impressionists - Morisot, Cassatt, Bracquemond, and Gonzalès - emerged as artists at a time when the art world, at least in terms of Paris, was increasingly becoming feminized. 609 works by women were shown in the 1900 Salon, as opposed to 66 by women in the 1800 Salon; women represented 20% of the artists shown in painting and graphic arts between 1818 and 1877, and close to 30% by the end of the 1890s.

Source: Women Artists in Paris 1850-1900

 Anna Ancher, Danish, 1859 -1935
 Harriet Backer, Norwegian, 1845-1932
 Marie Bashkirtseff, née Maria Konstantinovna Bashkirtsena, French, 1858-1884
 Amélie Beaury-Saurel, French, 1848-1924
 Cecilia Beaux, American, 1855-1942
 Anna Bilinska-Bohdanowicz, Polish, 1857-1893
 Marie Bracquemond, French, 1840-1916
 Louise Catherine Breslau, German, 1856-1927
 Lady Elizabeth Butler, née Elizabeth Southerden Thompson, British, 1846-1933
 Mina Carlson-Bredberg, Swedish, 1857-1943
 Mary Cassatt, American, 1844-1926
 Mary Cazin, French, 1844-1924
 Fanny Churberg, Finnish, 1845-1892
 Elin Daneilson-Gambogi, Finnish, 1861-1919
 Julie Delance-Ferugard, French, 1859-1892
 Virginie Demont-Breton, French, 1859-1935
 Elizabeth Jane Gardner Bouguereau, American, 1837-1922
 Eva Gonzalès, French, 1849-1883
 Annie Hopf, Swiss, 1861-1918
 Kitty Kieland, Norwegian, 1843-1914
 Anna Elizabeth Klumpke, American, 1856-1942
 Emma Löwstädt-Chadwick, Swedish, 1855-1932
 Paula Modersohn-Becker, German, 1876-1907
 Berthe Morisot, French, 1841-1895
 Asta Nørregaard, Norwegian, 1853-1933
 Elizabeth Nourse, American, 1859-1938
 Hanna Pauli, Swedish, 1864-1940
 Lilla Cabot Perry, American, 1848-1933
 Marie Petiet, French, 1854-1893
 Helene Schjerfbeck, Finnish, 1862-1946
 Mary Shepard Greene Blumenschein, American, 1869-1958
 Marianne Stokes, née Preindlsberger, Austrian, 1855-1927
 Annie Louise Swynnerton, née Robinson, English, 1844-1933
 Ellen Thesleff, Finnish, 1869-1954

References 

Impressionist artists